Jehannum may refer to:
 Jahannam, the Islamic conception of Hell.
 Jehannum, a character in The Chronicles of Thomas Covenant, the Unbeliever.